Barbra Mette Stockfleth "Babben" Enger-Damon (née Enger on 19 September 1939) is a retired Norwegian cross-country skier who competed at the 1964 and 1968 Olympics. She won a gold medal in the 3 × 5 km relay and finished eighth in the 10 km in 1968. Domestically she won the 10 km Norwegian title in 1963 and 1964.

Enger is the daughter of Norwegian painter Erling Enger. Between the 1964 and 1968 she married American cross-country skier Larry Damon; they first lived in Norway, but later moved to Vermont in the United States. Besides skiing she competed in the national championships in sailing and orienteering, a won one a gold medal in sailing and a silver and bronze medals in orienteering.

Cross-country skiing results

Olympic Games
1 medal – (1 gold)

References

Cross-country skiers at the 1964 Winter Olympics
Cross-country skiers at the 1968 Winter Olympics
1939 births
Norwegian female cross-country skiers
Olympic cross-country skiers of Norway
Living people
Olympic gold medalists for Norway
Olympic medalists in cross-country skiing
Medalists at the 1968 Winter Olympics
Skiers from Oslo
20th-century Norwegian women